Md Enayet Ullah is a retired major general of the Bangladesh Army. He was adjutant general at the Bangladesh Army Headquarters.

Early life and education
Enayet Ullah was born on 7 January 1965 in Kurigram District, East Pakistan, Pakistan. He graduated from Rangpur Cadet College. He also graduated from PLA National Defence University and Defence Services Command and Staff College. He has a Masters in Defence Studies from the  National University, Bangladesh. He completed an MBA from Royal University of Dhaka.

Career

Ullah was commissioned in the 12th Bangladesh Military Academy Long Course on 19 May 1985. He served as the Brigade Major of the 66th Artillery Brigade. He served as the General Staff Officer at the Army Training and Doctrine Command. He served in the United Nations Iraq–Kuwait Observation Mission and the United Nations Integrated Mission in East Timor. He served as the Director in charge of the Administration and Logistics Directorate at the Armed Forces Division. He had served as the commandant of the Bangladesh Institute of Peace Support Operation Training.

Ullah was the commander of the 9 Artillery Brigade and 27 Field Regiment Artillery. He was the commandant of the Defence Services Command and Staff College. He was the chairman of Bangladesh Tea Board. He was the Vice-President of Bangladesh Golf Federation and the Kurmitola Golf Club. He was the Vice-Chairman of the Trust Bank Limited. On 20 February 2020, he was appointed the adjutant general at the Bangladesh Army Headquarters.

References

Living people
Bangladesh Army generals
1965 births